Pieter or Peter Casteels may refer to:

 Pieter Casteels III (1684–1749), Flemish painter and engraver
 Pieter Casteels II (fl. 1673–1700), Flemish painter
 Peter Frans Casteels (fl. 1673–1700), Flemish painter